A movie palace (or picture palace in the United Kingdom) is any of the large, elaborately decorated movie theaters built between the 1910s and the 1940s. The late 1920s saw the peak of the movie palace, with hundreds opening every year between 1925 and 1930. With the advent of television, movie attendance dropped, while the rising popularity of large multiplex chains in the 1980s and 1990s signaled the obsolescence of single-screen theaters. Many movie palaces were razed or converted into multiple-screen venues or performing arts centers, though some have undergone restoration and reopened to the public as historic buildings.

There are three architectural design types of movie palaces: the classical-style movie palace, with opulent, luxurious architecture; the atmospheric theatre, which has an auditorium ceiling that resembles an open sky as a defining feature; and the Art Deco theaters that became popular in the 1930s.

Background
Paid exhibition of motion pictures began on April 14, 1894, at Andrew M. Holland's phonograph store, located at 1155 Broadway in New York City, with the Kinetoscope. Dropping a nickel in a machine allowed a viewer to see a short motion picture, devoid of plot. The machines were installed in Kinetoscope parlors, hotels, department stores, bars and drugstores in large American cities. The machines were popular from 1894 to 1896, but by the turn of the century had almost disappeared as Americans rejected the solitary viewing experience and boring entertainment.

Around 1900, motion pictures became a small part of vaudeville theatres. The competitive vaudeville theatre market caused owners to constantly look for new entertainment, and the motion picture helped create demand, although the new form of entertainment was not the main draw for patrons. It was often used as a "chaser"—shown as the end of the performance to chase the audience from the theatre. These theatres were designed much like legitimate theatres. The Beaux-Arts architecture of these theatres was formal and ornate. They were not designed for motion pictures, but rather live stage performances.

In 1902, the storefront theatre was born at Thomas Lincoln Tally's Electric Theatre in Los Angeles. These soon spread throughout the country as empty storefronts were equipped with chairs, a Vitascope projector, a muslin sheet on which the motion picture was exhibited, darkened windows, and a box by the door to service as a ticket office (literally, the "box office".) Storefront theatres, supplied with motion pictures made in Chicago and New York, spread throughout America. These theatres exhibited a motion picture at a specific time during the day.

Air domes also became popular in warm climates and in the summertime in northern climates. With no roof and only side walls or fences, the air domes allowed patrons to view motion pictures in a venue that was cooler than the stifling atmosphere of the storefront theatre.

In 1905, the nickelodeon was born. Rather than exhibiting one program a night, the nickelodeon offered continuous motion picture entertainment for five cents. They were widely popular. By 1910, nickelodeons grossed $91 million in the United States. The nickelodeons were like simple storefront theatres, but differed in the continuous showings and the marketing to women and families.

The movie house, in a building designed specifically for motion picture exhibition, was the last step before the movie palace. Comfort was paramount, with upholstered seating and climate controls. One of the first movie houses was Tally's Broadway Theater in Los Angeles.

History

The movie palace was developed as the step beyond the small theaters of the 1900s and 1910s. As motion pictures developed as an art form, theatre infrastructure needed to change. Storefront theatres and nickelodeons catered to the busy work lives and limited budgets of the lower and middle classes. Motion pictures were generally only thought to be for the lower classes at that time as they were simple, short, and cost only five cents to attend. While the middle class regularly began to attend the nickelodeons by the early 1910s the upperclass continued to attend stage theater performances such as opera and big-time vaudeville. However, as more sophisticated, complex, and longer films featuring prominent stage actors were developed, the upperclass desires to attend the movies began to increase and a demand for higher class theaters began to develop. Nickelodeons could not meet this demand as the upperclass feared the moral repercussions of intermingling between women and children with immigrants. There were also real concerns over the physical safety of the nickelodeon theaters themselves as they were often cramped with little ventilation and the nitrate film stock used at the time was extremely flammable.

The demand for an upscale film theater, suitable to exhibit films to the upperclass, was first met when the Regent Theater, designed by Thomas Lamb, was opened in February 1913, becoming the first ever movie palace. However the theater's location in Harlem prompted many to suggest that the theater be moved to Broadway alongside the stage theaters. These desires were satisfied when Lamb built the Strand Theatre on Broadway, which was opened in 1914 by Mitchel H. Mark at the cost of one million dollars. This opening was the first example of a success in drawing the upper middle class to the movies and it spurred others to follow suit. As their name implies movie palaces were advertised to, "make the average citizen feel like royalty." To accomplish this these theaters were outfitted with a plethora amenities such as larger sitting areas, air conditioning, and even childcare services.

Between 1914 and 1922 over 4,000 movie palaces were opened. Notable pioneers of movies palaces include the Chicago firm of Rapp and Rapp, which designed the Chicago,  Uptown, and Oriental Theatres. S.L. "Roxy" Rothafel, originated the deluxe presentation of films with themed stage shows. Sid Grauman, built the first movie palace on the West Coast, Los Angeles' Million Dollar Theater, in 1918.

Decline
Following World War II movie ticket sales began to rapidly decline due to the widespread adoption of television and mass migration of the population from the cities, where all the movie palaces had been built, into the suburbs. The closing of most movie palaces occurred after United States v. Paramount Pictures, Inc. in 1948, which ordered all of the major film studios to sell their theaters. Most of the newly independent theaters could not continue to operate on the low admissions sales of the time without the financial support of the major studios and were forced to close. Many were able to stay in business by converting to operate as race or pornography theaters.

The death knell for single-screen movie theaters (including movie palaces) arrived with the development of the multiplex in the 1980s and the megaplex in the 1990s.  Technically, Stanley Durwood of AMC Theatres did not build the first multiple-screen movie theater, but he is now credited as more responsible than anyone else for leading the film exhibition industry into "splitsville".

By 2004, only about a quarter of U.S. movie theaters still had only one screen, and the average number of screens per theater was 6.1.

Design
Eberson specialized in the subgenre of "atmospheric" theatres.  His first, of the 500 in his career, was the 1923 Majestic in Houston, Texas.  The atmospherics usually conveyed the impression of sitting in an outdoor courtyard, surrounded by highly ornamented asymmetrical facades and exotic flora and fauna, underneath a dark blue canopy; when the lights went out, a specially designed projector, the Brenograph, was used to project clouds, and special celestial effects on the ceiling.

Lamb's style was initially based on the more traditional, "hardtop" form patterned on opera houses, but was no less ornate. His theaters evolved from relatively restrained neo-classic designs in the 1910s to those with elaborate baroque and Asian motifs in the late 1920s.

The movie palace's signature look was one of extravagant ornamentation. The theaters were often designed with an eclectic exoticism where a variety of referenced visual styles collided wildly with one another.  French Baroque, High Gothic, Moroccan, Mediterranean, Spanish Gothic, Hindu, Babylonian, Aztec, Mayan, Orientalist, Italian Renaissance, and (after the discovery of King Tut's tomb in 1922) Egyptian Revival were all variously mixed and matched.  This wealth of ornament was not merely for aesthetic effect.  It was meant to create a fantasy environment to attract moviegoers and involved a type of social engineering, distraction, and traffic management, meant to work on human bodies and minds in a specific way. Today, most of the surviving movie palaces operate as regular theaters, showcasing concerts, plays and operas.

List of movie palaces

This is a list of selected movie palaces, with location and year of construction.

 Akron Civic Theatre (formerly Loew's (Akron) Theatre), Akron, Ohio, 1929
 Alabama Theatre, Birmingham, Alabama, 1927
 Alameda Theatre, Alameda, California, 1932
 Albee Theater, Cincinnati, Ohio, 1927
 Alex Theatre, Glendale, California, 1925
 Arcada Theater, St. Charles, Illinois, 1926
 Arlington Theater, Santa Barbara, California, 1931
 Arvest Midland Theater Kansas City, Missouri, 1927
 Avalon Regal Theater, Chicago, Illinois, 1927
 Aztec Theatre, San Antonio, Texas, 1926
 Bama Theatre, Tuscaloosa, Alabama, 1938
 Biograph Theater, Chicago, 1914
 Boyd Theatre, Philadelphia, 1928
 Brauntex Theatre, New Braunfels, Texas 1942
 Broadway Theatre, Mount Pleasant, Michigan, 1920
 Byrd Theatre, Richmond, Virginia, 1928
 California Theatre, San Jose, California, 1927
 The Capitol, Melbourne, Australia, 1924
 Capitol Cinema, Ottawa, Ontario, 1920
 Capitol Theatre, Rome, New York, 1928
 Capitol Theatre Port Chester, New York, 1926
 Capitol Theatre, Vancouver, British Columbia, 1921
 Carlton Cinema, London, UK, 1930
 Carolina Theatre, Durham, North Carolina, 1926
 Carpenter Theater, Richmond, Virginia, 1928
 Castro Theatre, San Francisco, California, 1922
 Commodore Picture House, Liverpool, UK, 1930
 Chicago Theatre, Chicago, Illinois, 1921
 Circle Theatre, Indianapolis, Indiana, 1916
 Congress Theater, Chicago, Illinois, 1926
 Coolidge Corner Theatre, Brookline, Massachusetts, 1933
 Coronado Theatre, Rockford, Illinois, 1927
 Crest Theatre, Sacramento, California, 1912
 Del Mar Theatre, Santa Cruz, California
 Dominion Cinema, Edinburgh, UK, 1938
 Duke of York's Picture House, Brighton, UK, 1910
 Egyptian Theatre, Boise, Idaho, 1927
 Egyptian Theatre, DeKalb, Illinois, 1929
 El Capitan Theatre, Los Angeles, California, 1926
 The Electric Cinema, London, UK, 1910
 Elgin and Winter Garden Theatres, Toronto, Ontario, 1913
 Embassy Theatre (Fort Wayne), Fort Wayne, Indiana, 1928
 Empire Theater, Sellersburg, Indiana
 Everyman Cinema, Muswell Hill, London, UK, 1935
 Englert Theatre, Iowa City, Iowa 1912
 Fargo Theatre, Fargo, North Dakota 1926
 Florida Theatre, Jacksonville, Florida, 1927
 Fourth Avenue Theatre (Anchorage, Alaska), Anchorage, Alaska, 1947
 Fox Theatre, Atlanta, Georgia, 1929, the only surviving movie palace in Atlanta
 Fox Theatre, Bakersfield, 1930
 Fox Theatre, Detroit, 1928
 Fox Theatre, Salinas, California
 Fox Theatre, San Diego, California, 1929, now Copley Symphony Hall
 Fox Theatre, San Francisco, California, 1929
 Fox Theater, Spokane, Washington, 1931
 Fox Theatre, St. Louis, Missouri, 1929
 Tooting Granada, London, UK, 1931
 Garde Arts Center, New London, Connecticut, 1926
 Garneau Theatre, Edmonton, Alberta, 1940
 Gateway Theatre, Chicago, 1930
 Gaumont State, London, UK, 1937
 Golden State Theatre, Monterey, California, 1926
 Granada Theatre, Sherbrooke, Quebec, 1929
 Grand Lake Theater, Oakland, California, 1926
 Grauman's Chinese Theatre, Los Angeles, 1927
 Grauman's Egyptian Theatre, Los Angeles 1922
 Hammersmith Apollo, London, UK, 1932
 Hawaii Theatre, Honolulu, 1922
 Hayden Orpheum Picture Palace, Sydney, Australia, 1935
 Indiana Theatre (Indianapolis), 1933
 Indiana Theatre (Terre Haute, Indiana), 1922
 Ironwood Theatre, Ironwood, Michigan, 1928
 Jefferson Theatre, Beaumont, Texas 1927
 Jefferson Theater, Charlottesville, Virginia, 1912
 The Kensington Cinema (now Odeon), London, UK, 1926
 Kentucky Theater, Lexington, Kentucky, 1922
 Lafayette Theatre, Suffern, New York, 1924
 Landmark Theatre, Richmond, Virginia, 1926
 Landmark Theatre, 1928 (formerly Loew's State Theatre), Syracuse, New York
 Lensic Theater, Santa Fe, New Mexico, 1931
 Loew's 175th Street Theater, New York City, 1930
 Loew's Grand Theatre, Atlanta, Georgia, 1920s
 Loew's Jersey Theatre, Jersey City, New Jersey, 1929
 Loew's Kings Theatre, Brooklyn, New York, 1929
 Loew's Paradise Theatre, The Bronx, New York, 1929
 Loew's Penn Theatre, (now Heinz Hall), Pittsburgh, 1927
 Loew's State Palace Theatre, New Orleans, 1926
 Loew's State Theatre, (now Providence Performing Arts Center), Providence, Rhode Island, 1928
 Loew's State Theatre, now TCC Jeanne & George Roper Performing Arts Center, Norfolk, Virginia, 1929
 Loew's Tara Cinema, Atlanta, Ga., 1968, now a multiplex; renamed the Lefont Tara years later, and now the Regal Tara
 Loew's Valencia Theatre, Queens, New York, 1929
 Los Angeles Theatre, Los Angeles
 Lorenzo Theatre, San Lorenzo, California,  currently in restoration by the Lorenzo Theatre Foundation.
 Lucas Theatre, Savannah, Georgia, 1921
 Mainstreet Theater, Kansas City, Missouri, 1921 (formerly the Empire and the RKO Missouri)
 Majestic Theatre, Dallas, Texas 1921
 Majestic Theatre, San Antonio, TX 1929
 Manchester Apollo, Manchester, UK, 1938
 Mark Strand Theatre, New York City, 1914
 Martin's Cinerama, Atlanta, Georgia, 1962 (formerly the Tower Theatre, later renamed the Atlanta Theatre and later still, the Columbia Theatre; from 1962 onward, however, no matter what the name, it always retained its ultra-curved screen. Later stopped its movie operations and became the new home of the Academy Theatre, the oldest live professional theatre company in Georgia.)
 Michigan Theater, Ann Arbor, Michigan, 1928
 Michigan Theatre, Detroit, 1926
 Michigan (now Frauenthal) Theater, Muskegon, Michigan, 1929
 Million Dollar Theater, Los Angeles, 1918
 Norwalk Theatre, Norwalk, Ohio, 1941
 North Park Theatre, Buffalo, New York, 1920
 Odeon Leicester Square, London, UK, 1937
 Odeon Cinema, Manchester, UK, 1930
 Odeon North End Cinema, Portsmouth, UK, 1936
 Ohio Theatre, Columbus, Ohio, 1928
 Ohio Theatre, Cleveland, 1921
 Olympia Theatre, Miami, 1926
 Oriental Theatre, Chicago, 1926
 Oriental Theatre, Milwaukee, 1927
 Orpheum Theatre, Sioux City, Iowa, 1927
 Orpheum Theatre, Memphis, Tennessee, 1928
 Orpheum Theatre, Vancouver, British Columbia, 1927
 Orpheum Theatre, Wichita, Kansas, 1922
 Ouimetoscope, Montreal, 1906
 Oxford Picture Hall, Whitstable, Kent, UK, 1912
 Palace Theatre Syracuse, NY 1924
 Palace Theatre, Albany, New York, 1931
 Palace Theatre (Marion, Ohio), 1928
 Palace Theatre, Cleveland, 1922
 Palace Theatre (Canton, Ohio), 1926
 Palace Theatre, Lorain, Ohio 1928
 Palace Theatre, Louisville, Kentucky, 1928
 Palace Theatre, Columbus, Ohio, 1927
 Pantages Theatre (Los Angeles), Los Angeles, 1930
 Pantages Theatre (Salt Lake City), Salt Lake City, 1918
 Paramount Theatre, Abilene, Texas, 1930
 Paramount Theatre, Aurora, Illinois, 1931
 Paramount Theatre, Austin, Minnesota, 1929
 Paramount Theatre, Austin, Texas, 1915
 Paramount Theatre, Cedar Rapids, Iowa, 1928
 Paramount Theater, Denver, Colorado, 1930
 Paramount Theatre, Oakland, California, 1931
 Paramount Theatre, Portland, Oregon, 1928, (now the Arlene Schnitzer Concert Hall)
 Paramount Theatre, Seattle 1927
 Paramount Theater, Springfield, Massachusetts, 1926, (formerly known as Julia Sanderson Theater and The Hippodrome)
 Peery's Egyptian Theatre, Ogden, Utah, 1924
 Pickwick Theatre, Park Ridge, Illinois, 1928
 Phoenix Cinema, East Finchley, UK, 1912
 Plaza Cinema, Port Talbot, UK, 1940
 Plaza Theatre, El Paso, Texas, 1930
 Polk Theatre, Lakeland, Florida, 1928
 Pomona Fox Theater, Pomona, California, 1931
 Princess Theatre, Edmonton, Alberta, 1915
 Quo Vadis Entertainment Center, Westland, Michigan, 1966
 Radio City Music Hall, New York City, 1932
 Redford Theatre, Detroit, Michigan, 1928
 Regent Theatre, Mudgee (New South Wales), Australia, 1935
 The Rex, Berkhamsted, England, UK, 1938
 Rialto Theatre, Montreal, 1924
 Rialto Square Theatre, Joliet, Illinois, 1926
 Ritz Theatre, Tiffin, Ohio, 1928
 Riviera Theater, Chicago, 1918
 Riviera Theatre, North Tonawanda, New York, 1926
 Rockingham Theatre, Reidsville, North Carolina, 1929
 Roxie Theater, San Francisco, 1909
 Roxy Theatre, New York City, 1927
 Roxy Theatre, Atlanta, Georgia, built 1926, renamed the Roxy in 1938
 Roxy Theatre, Saskatoon, Saskatchewan, 1930
 Saenger Theatre, Mobile, Alabama, 1927
 Saenger Theatre, New Orleans, 1927
 Saenger Theatre, Pensacola, Florida, 1925
 Saenger Theatre, Hattiesburg, Mississippi, 1929
 Senator Theatre, Baltimore, 1939
 Shea's Performing Arts Center, Buffalo, New York, 1926
 Snowdon Theatre, Montreal, 1937
 Stanford Theatre, Palo Alto, California, 1925, restored 1989
 Stanley Theater (now an Assembly Hall of Jehovah's Witnesses), Jersey City, New Jersey, 1928
 Stanley Theater, (now Benedum Center), Pittsburgh, 1928
 Stanley Theatre, Utica, New York, 1928
 Stanley Theatre (now Stanley Industrial Alliance Stage), Vancouver, British Columbia, 1930
 State Cinema (now Focal Point Cinema & Cafe), Hastings, New Zealand, 1933
 State Theater, Cleveland, 1921
 State Theatre, Kalamazoo, Michigan, 1927
 State Theatre, Woodland, California
 State Theatre Center for the Arts, Uniontown, Pennsylvania 1922
 The Strand Theatre, Marietta, Georgia 1935
 St. George Theatre, Staten Island, New York, 1929
 Suffolk Theater, Riverhead, New York 1933
 Sun Theatre, Melbourne (Victoria), Australia, 1938
 Sunnyvale Theater, Sunnyvale, California, 1926; formerly the New Strand Theater
 Tampa Theatre, Tampa, Florida, 1926
 Tennessee Theatre, Knoxville, Tennessee, 1928
 Troxy Cinema, London, UK, 1933
 United Artists Theatre, Los Angeles, 1927; reopened in 2014 as part of the Ace Hotel 
 Uptown Theater, Washington, D.C., 1933
 Uptown Theatre, Chicago, 1925
 Uptown Theater, Minneapolis, 1913
 Uptown Theatre, Toronto, 1920
 Uptown Theatre, Utica, New York, 1927
 Varsity Theatre, Palo Alto, California, 1927
 Victory Theatre, Evansville, Indiana, 1921; formerly the Loew's Victory 
 Virginia Theatre, Champaign, Illinois, 1921
 Warner Grand Theatre, San Pedro, Los Angeles, California, 1931
 Warner Theater, Powers Auditorium, Youngstown, Ohio, 1930
 Warner Theatre, Erie, Pennsylvania, 1931
 Warner Theatre (now Powers Auditorium), Youngstown, Ohio, 1931
 Warnors Theatre, Fresno, California, 1928
 Warren Theatres, Wichita, Kansas, 1996
 Washoe Theater, Anaconda, Montana, 1931
 Weinberg Center, Frederick, Maryland, 1926  (formerly the Tivoli Theatre)
 Wilshire Theater, Beverly Hills, California, 1930
 Wiltern Theatre, Los Angeles, 1930

See also 
Timothy L. Pflueger
A. J. Balaban
John Eberson

Notes

Citations

References 
 Valentine, Maggie. The Show Starts on the Sidewalk: An Architectural History of the Movie Theatre, Starring S. Charles Lee. New Haven, Connecticut: Yale University Press, 1994.

External links 
 Cinema Treasures
 Theatre Historical Society of America
 Historic Theaters
 

Cinemas and movie theaters in the United States
 
History of film